Villa Sant'Antonio (Sant'Antoni in Sardinian language) is a comune (municipality) in the Province of Oristano in the Italian region Sardinia, located about  north of Cagliari and about  east of Oristano.

Villa Sant'Antonio borders the following municipalities: Albagiara, Assolo, Asuni, Mogorella, Ruinas, Senis.

References

Cities and towns in Sardinia